James Marr House and Farm is a historic home and farm located at Columbus Township, Flat Rock Township, and German Township, Bartholomew County, Indiana. The house was built in 1871, and is a two-story, three bay, brick dwelling with a two-story, rear ell. It sits on a stone foundation and has a gable roof. Also on the property are the contributing brick smoke house, wash / wood house, milk house, garage, shed, small barn, large barn, chicken house, and late-19th century tenant house.

It was listed on the National Register of Historic Places in 1980.

References

Farms on the National Register of Historic Places in Indiana
Houses completed in 1871
Buildings and structures in Bartholomew County, Indiana
National Register of Historic Places in Bartholomew County, Indiana